Tipula metacomet is a species of large crane fly in the family Tipulidae named for the Wampanoag chief Metacomet.

References

Tipulidae
Articles created by Qbugbot
Insects described in 1965